Michael Charles Brown (born December 29, 1959) is an American former professional baseball outfielder.

Career
Brown was selected by the California Angels in the 7th round of the 1980 Major League Baseball Draft. He was 23 years old when he broke into the big leagues with the Angels on July 21, 1983. He was traded along with Pat Clements from the Angels to the Pirates for John Candelaria, George Hendrick and Al Holland on August 2 in a transaction that was completed two weeks later on August 16 when Bob Kipper was sent to Pittsburgh.

In 315 games over five seasons, Brown posted a .265 batting average (239-for-903) with 105 runs, 23 home runs and 113 RBIs. He finished his major league career with a .964 fielding percentage paying at all three outfield positions.

In 1990, Brown played in the Nippon Professional Baseball for the Yomiuri Giants. In 70 games, he batted .282 with 7 home runs and 29 runs batted in.

References

External links

1959 births
Living people
American expatriate baseball players in Canada
American expatriate baseball players in Japan
Baseball players from San Francisco
California Angels players
Edmonton Trappers players
Hawaii Islanders players
Holyoke Millers players
Major League Baseball right fielders
Minor league baseball managers
Nippon Professional Baseball outfielders
Pittsburgh Pirates players
Richmond Braves players
Salinas Angels players
San Jose State Spartans baseball players
Spokane Indians players
Toledo Mud Hens players
Yomiuri Giants players